Martin Berkovec (born 12 February 1989) is a professional Czech football goalkeeper currently playing for FC Zbrojovka Brno.

Career
He made his league debut on 8 March 2015 in FC Hlučín's 0–1 Czech National Football League away loss against FK Fotbal Třinec.

In February 2017, his life was saved by opposition team player Francis Koné who prevented Berkovec from swallowing his tongue after being knocked unconscious. Francis Koné was awarded the FIFA Fair Play Award.

In January 2021 he signed one and half year contract with Czech side Zbrojovka Brno.

Honours
Slavia Prague
 Czech First League: 2016–17
Žalgiris Vilnius
 A Lyga: 2020

References

External links
 
 

1989 births
Living people
Czech footballers
Czech expatriate footballers
Czech First League players
Czech National Football League players
A Lyga players
SK Slavia Prague players
FC Hlučín players
FC Silon Táborsko players
Bohemians 1905 players
MFK Karviná players
FK Žalgiris players
FC Zbrojovka Brno players
Association football goalkeepers
Expatriate footballers in Lithuania
Czech expatriate sportspeople in Lithuania
Footballers from Prague